George Pitt (died 1745) of Shroton, Dorset and Strathfieldsaye, Hampshire, was a British landowner and Tory politician who sat in the House of Commons between 1715 and 1727.

Pitt was born after 1691, the eldest son of George Pitt of Strathfieldsaye, Hampshire, and his first wife Lucy Pile, daughter of Thomas Pile of Baverstock, Wiltshire. and Shroton, Dorset.  By 1721, he had married Mary Louisa Bernier, daughter of John Bernier of Strasburg, in Alsace. His mother had died on 17 November 1697 and in 1714 he succeeded to the Dorset estates of his maternal grandfather.

Pitt  was returned as a Tory Member of Parliament for Wareham on his family  interest   at a by-election on 18 April 1715 after  his father, elected at the 1715 British general election, chose to sit for Hampshire instead. Like his father, he refused to sign the loyal association in December 1715. He voted against the septennial bill in 1716, but was absent from the divisions on the repeal of the Occasional Conformity and Schism Acts and the Peerage Bill in 1719. At the 1722 British general election, he lost his seat at Wareham. He appears to have changed sides  as he defeated  the Tory, Thomas Horner, at a by-election for Dorset on 25 January 1727, with the help of Bubb Dodington, who described him as ‘scarcely capable’.  Before the 1727 later in the year, Richard Edgcumbe reported to Walpole that Pitt had changed sides again and Pitt did not stand at the election.

Pitt separated from his wife according to a petition of his brother-in-law, Henry Bernier, supported by an affidavit of Mary Louisa Pitt, dated 21 March 1730. It claimed she ‘was forcibly abducted from London by her husband,... and kept locked up at  ...  at Melcombe, in Dorset. Pitt succeeded his father to  Strathfieldsaye  in 1735.  He died in October 1745 leaving four sons and two daughters.

References

Year of birth missing
1745 deaths
Members of the Parliament of Great Britain for English constituencies
British MPs 1715–1722
British MPs 1727–1734